El Omar Fardi (born 22 April 2002) is a professional footballer who plays as a defender for Marseille B. Born in France, he represents the Comoros national team.

Club career
A youth product of Busserine, Fardi signed with Marseille's youth academy on 7 February 2018. He debuted with their reserve team in a 5–4 Championnat National 3 win over Jura Sud on 14 February 2020. He signed his first aspirant contract with Marseille on 2 April 2021.

International career
Fardi made his senior international debut for Comoros in a 2021 FIFA Arab Cup qualification match against Palestine, a 5–1 defeat.

References

External links
 
 OM 1899 Profile

2002 births
Living people
Footballers from Marseille
Citizens of Comoros through descent
Comorian footballers
Comoros international footballers
French footballers
French sportspeople of Comorian descent
Olympique de Marseille players
Championnat National 3 players
Association football defenders